In cryptography, a Caesar cipher, also known as Caesar's cipher, the shift cipher, Caesar's code or Caesar shift, is one of the simplest and most widely known encryption techniques. It is a type of substitution cipher in which each letter in the plaintext is replaced by a letter some fixed number of positions down the alphabet. The method is named after Julius Caesar, who used it in his private correspondence.

The encryption step performed by a Caesar cipher is often incorporated as part of more complex schemes, such as the Vigenère cipher, and still has modern application in the ROT13 system. As with all single-alphabet substitution ciphers, the Caesar cipher is easily broken and in modern practice offers essentially no communications security.

Example
The transformation can be represented by aligning two alphabets; the cipher alphabet is the plain alphabet rotated left or right by some number of positions. For instance, here is a Caesar cipher using a left rotation of three places, equivalent to a right shift of 23 (the shift parameter is used as the key):

When encrypting, a person looks up each letter of the message in the "plain" line and writes down the corresponding letter in the "cipher" line.
 
 Plaintext:  THE QUICK BROWN FOX JUMPS OVER THE LAZY DOG
 Ciphertext: QEB NRFZH YOLTK CLU GRJMP LSBO QEB IXWV ALD

Deciphering is done in reverse, with a right shift of 3.

The encryption can also be represented using modular arithmetic by first transforming the letters into numbers, according to the scheme, A → 0, B → 1, ..., Z → 25. Encryption of a letter x by a shift n can be described mathematically as,

 

Decryption is performed similarly,

 

(Here, "mod" refers to the modulo operation.

The replacement remains the same throughout the message, so the cipher is classed as a type of monoalphabetic substitution, as opposed to polyalphabetic substitution.

History and usage

The Caesar cipher is named after Julius Caesar, who, according to Suetonius, used it with a shift of three (A becoming D when encrypting, and D becoming A when decrypting) to protect messages of military significance. While Caesar's was the first recorded use of this scheme, other substitution ciphers are known to have been used earlier.

His nephew, Augustus, also used the cipher, but with a right shift of one, and it did not wrap around to the beginning of the alphabet:

Evidence exists that Julius Caesar also used more complicated systems, and one writer, Aulus Gellius, refers to a (now lost) treatise on his ciphers:

It is unknown how effective the Caesar cipher was at the time; there is no record at that time of any techniques for the solution of simple substitution ciphers. The earliest surviving records date to the 9th-century works of Al-Kindi in the Arab world with the discovery of frequency analysis.

A Caesar cipher with a shift of one is used on the back of the mezuzah to encrypt the names of God. This may be a holdover from an earlier time when Jewish people were not allowed to have mezuzot. The letters of the cryptogram themselves comprise a religiously significant "divine name" which Orthodox belief holds keeps the forces of evil in check.

In the 19th century, the personal advertisements section in newspapers would sometimes be used to exchange messages encrypted using simple cipher schemes. Kahn (1967) describes instances of lovers engaging in secret communications enciphered using the Caesar cipher in The Times. Even as late as 1915, the Caesar cipher was in use: the Russian army employed it as a replacement for more complicated ciphers which had proved to be too difficult for their troops to master; German and Austrian cryptanalysts had little difficulty in decrypting their messages.

Caesar ciphers can be found today in children's toys such as secret decoder rings. A Caesar shift of thirteen is also performed in the ROT13 algorithm, a simple method of obfuscating text widely found on Usenet and used to obscure text (such as joke punchlines and story spoilers), but not seriously used as a method of encryption.

The Vigenère cipher uses a Caesar cipher with a different shift at each position in the text; the value of the shift is defined using a repeating keyword. If the keyword is as long as the message, is chosen at random, never becomes known to anyone else, and is never reused, this is the one-time pad cipher, proven unbreakable. The conditions are so difficult they are, in practical effect, never achieved. Keywords shorter than the message (e.g., "Complete Victory" used by the Confederacy during the American Civil War), introduce a cyclic pattern that might be detected with a statistically advanced version of frequency analysis.

In April 2006, fugitive Mafia boss Bernardo Provenzano was captured in Sicily partly because some of his messages, clumsily written in a variation of the Caesar cipher, were broken. Provenzano's cipher used numbers, so that "A" would be written as "4", "B" as "5", and so on.

In 2011, Rajib Karim was convicted in the United Kingdom of "terrorism offences" after using the Caesar cipher to communicate with Bangladeshi Islamic activists discussing plots to blow up British Airways planes or disrupt their IT networks.  Although the parties had access to far better encryption techniques (Karim himself used PGP for data storage on computer disks), they chose to use their own scheme (implemented in Microsoft Excel), rejecting a more sophisticated code program called Mujahedeen Secrets "because 'kaffirs', or non-believers, know about it, so it must be less secure".

Breaking the cipher

The Caesar cipher can be easily broken even in a ciphertext-only scenario. Since there are only a limited number of possible shifts (25 in English), an attacker can mount a brute force attack by deciphering the message, or part of it, using each possible shift. The correct description will be the one which makes sense as English text. An example is shown on the right for the ciphertext ""; the candidate plaintext for shift four "" is the only one which makes sense as English text. Another type of brute force attack is to write out the alphabet beneath each letter of the ciphertext, starting at that letter. Again the correct decryption is the one which makes sense as English text. This technique is sometimes known as "completing the plain component".

Another approach is to match up the frequency distribution of the letters. By graphing the frequencies of letters in the ciphertext, and by knowing the expected distribution of those letters in the original language of the plaintext, a human can easily spot the value of the shift by looking at the displacement of particular features of the graph. This is known as frequency analysis. Computers can also do this by measuring how well the actual frequency distribution matches up with the expected distribution; for example, the chi-squared statistic can be used.

The unicity distance for the Caesar cipher is about 2, meaning that on average at least two characters of ciphertext are required to determine the key. In rare cases more text may be needed. For example the words "" and "" can be converted to each other with a Caesar shift, which means they can produce the same ciphertext with different shifts. However in practice the key can almost certainly be found with at least 6 characters of ciphertext.

With the Caesar cipher, encrypting a text multiple times provides no additional security. This is because two encryptions of, say, shift A and shift B, will be equivalent to a single encryption with shift . In mathematical terms, the set of encryption operations under each possible key forms a group under composition.

See also
 Scytale

Notes

Bibliography
 
  Chris Savarese and Brian Hart, The Caesar Cipher, 1999

Further reading

External links

 
 Simple Bash implementation

Classical ciphers
Group theory
Julius Caesar